Washington Township is one of seventeen townships in Adair County, Iowa, USA.  At the 2010 census, its population was 145.

History
Washington Township was organized in 1854.

Geography
According to the USGS, it contains six cemeteries: Avondale, Campbell, Garner, Mormon, Winn and Witt.

References

External links
 US-Counties.com
 City-Data.com

Townships in Adair County, Iowa
Townships in Iowa
1854 establishments in Iowa